Eucosma explicatana is a species of moth of the family Tortricidae. It is found in China (Tianjin, Hebei, Shanxi, Inner Mongolia, Heilongjiang, Zhejiang, Shaanxi, Ningxia), Mongolia, Russia and Kazakhstan.

Adults are on wing from June to July.

The larvae feed on Hypoestes cumingiana.

References

Moths described in 1900
Eucosmini